Dick Stewart (born February 11, 1927) is an American singer, bandleader, actor, television host, and author. From 1959 to 1963, he hosted the popular televised music show, KPIX Dance Party.

Background
In addition to being a television show host, Stewart was a singer, and had led his own band. He was also an actor. He was also a radio DJ for KFSO on Sundays with an hour show.

Actor
Stewart had a few acting roles. One was as Everett in the 1953 film The Glass Web which was directed by Jack Arnold. Other films include Good Morning, Miss Dove in 1955 and That's the Way of the World in 1975. He was the first host of the ABC-TV & Chuck Barris Game Show Beauty Pageant called The Dream Girl of 1967 from Monday December 19, 1966 to Friday June 23, 1967 except Bob Barker (Future Ex-Host of "The Price is Right" Guest Host for Monday-Friday June 12–16, 1967 for promoting Chuck Barris' New Game Show THE FAMILY GAME also on ABC-TV before Wink Martindale Hosted and his 2 Hostess are Beverly Adams (December 19–23, 1966) & Karen Valentine (December 26, 1966 – August 25, 1967.)

KPIX Dance Party
Stewart took over the show on February 23, 1959, filling the position of the previous host Ted Randall who had resigned. Stewart got the position after being the winner in a series of auditions which were broadcast live. For the show Stewart would make his own choice and pick which records would be played instead of relying on an automated computerized system. He once said that he would "rather pick records that are wrong, and have fun with then, than be right to the point of dullness". One of his aims was to give the youngsters a more exciting, literate type of music. He would occasionally slip in some big band type music such as Lionel Hampton or Henry Mancini. Sometimes he would play the B-sides of singles which had local viewers playing both sides of the record.

He hosted the show from 1959 to 1963.

Singer
As a singer, he performed at venues like the Off Broadway. In early 1962 he had a single out on the Penthouse label. It was "I Believe" bw "Without You". It was produced by George Motola. Around 1963, he recorded "I'll Change", which was produced by Al Hazan. The song was possibly intended for release on the Ava label but was rejected.

Discography

References

External links 
 

1927 births
Possibly living people
American television hosts